Chief Razak Akanni Okoya (born in Lagos on 12 January 1940) is a billionaire industrialist and the Aare of Lagos. He is the owner and founder of Eleganza group of companies, which has a market spanning Western Africa.

Early life
Razak Okoya is a Yoruba man from the south-western part of Nigeria. He was born to the family of Tiamiyu Ayinde Okoya in Lagos, the then capital. He attended Ansar-Un-Deen primary school in Oke Popo, his only formal schooling. He worked in his father's tailoring business, which also included the sale of tailoring accessories. The experience he got gave him the confidence to start tailoring activities on his own. He saved every penny he made until he had 20 pounds. His mother gave him the extra 50 pounds, and with the blessing of his father, he started importing and trading goods from Japan.

Business career

Razak Okoya's business expanded swiftly, he travelled far and wide and learnt how things were manufactured having the strong feeling that Nigeria could match that quality if not better.

His first wife, Kuburat Okoya, was obsessed with costly jewellery and he was always baffled at how much she said they cost. He strongly felt the prices were outrageous since the metals could be designed at a cheaper price and the metals were readily available in Nigeria. Challenged his perceived healthy demand, he travelled abroad, bought the machines. That marked the birth of Eleganza Jewelry. 
The success was phenomenal. They could not keep up with the demand because, the products were beautiful, durable and cheap. They were instant best sellers. He also started manufacturing buttons and jewellery.

He began the importation of shoes in large quantities, subsequently. On one of these occasions, the shoes were not delivered despite his payment. He travelled to Italy to see the manufacturer only to discover that they had used his money to settle their bills. He was so angry that he decided there and then to start manufacturing his own shoes. He imported all the machines and brought in some experts who trained his workers.

Today, under his Chairmanship, the Eleganza Industries produces a wide range of household goods and utensils including cutlery, collieries, food warmers, ice chest, electric fan, cosmetics and ballpoint pen. His factory locations include, Oregun-Ikeja, Isolo, Alaba and Iganmu, the Company now directly employs over five thousand Nigerians and non-Nigerians including those working in his RAO Property Investment Company. Okoya's Eleganza Group is one of the biggest homegrown conglomerates in Nigeria today, with over six factories, and its products are household names in Nigeria neighbouring African markets.

He was awarded the Lifetime Achievement Award as Business Entrepreneur of Our Time from Thisday Newspapers.

Residence

His magnificent and outlandish estate, "Oluwa ni Shola" (The Lord creates wealth) Estate at Lekki/Ajah Expressway is his primary residence. The "Oluwa ni shola" Estate, which is also described as an expatriates Estate because of the high number of expatriates living there, is well equipped with uninterrupted power and water supply, marble floors, central air-conditioning, sauna, lush gardens, billiard room, tennis court, swimming pools, expensive sculptures and lots more.
According to Bellanaija, "the music video [for "Suddenly"] was shot on location at Chief Razak Okoya's 'Oluwa Ni shola' Estate.

Quotes

"In school, I could see my teacher in worn and often shabby clothes and at the same time, I could see the well-dressed businessmen of Dosunmu Street, the heart of business in Lagos then. It was easy for me to choose business life."

" I keep to myself. I do not look at other people. I am content with myself. I do not look for cheap money. I am not interested in contracts and I do not expose myself to intrigues and politics."

"You do not do business for the ego value. You go for what the people can afford. In business, you have to ensure that the masses are able to afford the cost of your products. That is one of my secrets." 

"My main motivation was that I wanted to be rich and I knew I had to work very hard to get there."

"I have nothing against education. But at times, education gives people false confidence. It makes people relax, trusting in the power of their certificates rather than in working hard."

Children

Okoya has fathered many children from several marriages one of his senior wives of over 50 years marriage is Kuburat Olayinka Okoya who had seven children. His other wives are Ajoke Okoya, Yetunde Okoya, Jennifer Okoya, Zainab Okoya. His last wife is Shade Okoya, and her children are ‹ Olamide, Subomi, Oyinlola and Wahab.

Family

Razak Okoya has had a number of wives over the course of his life. Prominent amongst them are Alhaja Kuburat Okoya, his senior wife, and Dr. Shade Okoya, the C.E.O. of Eleganza Group. He has claimed that the latter is loyal and hardworking.

Chief Okoya has had several children with his various wives. One of them is Olori Moji Tejuosho, the consort of Omoba Lanre Tejuosho.

References

1940 births
Living people
Businesspeople from Lagos
Yoruba businesspeople
20th-century Nigerian businesspeople
21st-century Nigerian businesspeople
Nigerian tailors
Nigerian manufacturing businesspeople
Nigerian jewellers
Nigerian billionaires